Neodactria cochisensis is a moth in the family Crambidae. It was described by Bernard Landry and Valeriu Albu in 2012. It is found in North America, where it has been recorded from the Huachuca Mountains and Chiricahua Mountains in Arizona.

The length of the forewings is 6.5–7 mm for males and 8.5 mm for females. The ground color of the forewings is mostly mottled grayish brown with bi- or tricoloured scales. The median and subterminal lines are warmer brown. The hindwings are grayish brown.

Etymology
The species name is derived from Cochise County, the type locality.

References

Crambini
Moths described in 2012
Moths of North America